Petlawad Assembly constituency is one of the 230 Vidhan Sabha (Legislative Assembly) constituencies of Madhya Pradesh state in central India. Petlawad Assembly constituency is one of the three Assembly constituencies in Jhabua district.

Members of Legislative Assembly

See also

Petlawad

References

Assembly constituencies of Madhya Pradesh
Jhabua district